Pandey, Pande, or Panday (Hindi: पाण्डेय/पाण्डे/पाँडे/पाण्डेय) (Nepali: पाण्डे/पाँडे/पाण्डेय) is a surname found commonly among the communities of Brahmins in India and both Bahun and Chhetri communities of Nepal.

Pande dynasty of Nepal were the Chhetri aristocratic family who dominated the Nepalese administration and military up until the 19th century as Mulkaji and Mukhtiyar, both equivalent to Prime minister. Deshpande and other variations of this surname, ending in "-pande", are found in the Deccan region of India.

Notable people

 Aditya Pande, (born 1976) Indian contemporary artist
 Alok Pandey, Indian actor
 Ananya Panday, Indian actress
 Basdeo Panday, 5th Prime Minister of Trinidad and Tobago from 1995 to 2001
 B. D. Pande (born 1917), former governor of Punjab and West Bengal
 Bhim Bahadur Pande (1915-1992), Nepalese aristocrat, diplomat and historian, awarded title of Sardar
 Brij Bihari Pandey, political leader
 Chhavi Pandey (born 1994), Indian actress and anchor
 Chittu Pandey (1865–1946), Freedom fighter from Baliya
 Chunky Pandey (born 1962), Bollywood film star
 Dalbhanjan Pande, Nepalese politician, military officer and senior minister from Gora Pande clan
 Damodar Pande, Mulkaji (Prime Minister) of Kingdom of Nepal; Son of Kaji Kalu Pande
 Ganesh Pandey, first Kaji of Gorkha Kingdom
 Ganpath Rai Pandey, revolutionary, rebel leader and zamindar.
 Ghanshyam Pande, religious leader, commonly known as Swaminarayan; believed to be a deity by followers
 Govind Chandra Pande (1923–2011), historian
 Gyanendra Pandey (born 1972), Cricketer
 Kabinga Pande (born 1952), Minister of Foreign Affairs Zambia (originally hailing from Jabalpur, Madhya Pradesh)
 Kalu Pande (born Vamshidhar Pande); Kaji of Gorkha Kingdom, One of the Nepalese military leaders of Unification of Nepal, Leader of aristocratic Pande family of Nepal
 Kedar Pandey (1920–1982), Politician, Chief Minister of Bihar
 Rahul Sankrityayan (Kedarnath Pandey) Polyglot Writer, Padma Bhushan, Sahitya Academy Award winner
 Mahendra Bahadur Pandey (born 1948), Nepali politician
 Mangal Pandey an Indian soldier who played a key part in the events immediately preceding the outbreak of the Great Rebellion of 1857
 Manish Pandey (born 1989), Indian cricketer
 Manish Raj Pandey (born 1970), Nepalese cricketer
 Capt. Manoj Kumar Pandey, Indian Army officer from First Gorkha Rifles; winner of Param Vir Chakra, India's highest bravery award
 Mike Pandey, Wildlife film maker
 Mrinal Pande (born 1946), Indian journalist, editor, columnist, (TikamGarh, Madhya Pradesh)
 Neeraj Pandey (born 1973), Bollywood film director, writer & producer
 Nirmal Pandey (1962–2010), Bollywood actor from Nainital in Uttarakhand
 Nitesh Pandey (born 1973), Indian TV/films actor
 Piyush Pandey, Advertising executive, Mumbai, India
 Poonam Pandey (born 1991), Bollywood actor, Mumbai, India
 Pradeep Pandey Indian Film Actor
 Prasoon Pandey (born 1961), film director
 Prem Chand Pandey, Scientist and Founder Director, NCAOR-Indian Antarctic Program
 Prithvi Bahadur Pande, Chairman of Nepal Investment Bank
 Rahul Pandey, Indian playback singer
 Raj Mangal Pande (born 1920), politician, former Central HRD Cabinet Minister, Government of India
 Rajkumar R. Pandey Indian film director, producer, music composer and screenwriter
 Rana Jang Pande (Mukhtiyar), Prime Minister of Nepal, Son of Kaji Damodar Pande
 Ranajit Pande, Nepalese Mulkaji from aristocratic Pande family
 Rangaraj Pandey (born 1975), Tamil journalist, political analyst, actor, TV anchor
 Rati Pandey, Indian actress and anchor
 Ravish Kumar (full name Ravish Kumar Pandey), Journalist at NDTV
 Ritesh Pandey, Indian politician
 Ritesh Pandey, Indian singer
 Rohini Pande, economist
 Sandeep Pandey (born 1965), social activist
 Saroj Pandey, Indian politician and member of the Bharatiya Janata Party
 Shikha Pandey (born 1989), Indian female cricketer
 Surendra Pandey (born 1958), Nepali politician
 Tansen (Ramtanu Pandey), One of navratnas of Akbar and scholar of ragas and India's great musician
 Tarkeshwar Pandey, former Indian Member of Parliament
 Vamsharaj Pande – Dewan (Prime Minister) of Kingdom of Nepal
 V. C. Pande (1932–2005), former Cabinet Secretary and former governor, Bihar and Arunachal Pradesh
 Vijay Kumar Pandey, Nepali media personality 
 Vijay S. Pande (born 1970), protein biochemist
 Vinod Pande, film maker and author
 Members of Pande family

See also
 Deshpande
 Panday (disambiguation)
 Pandey (disambiguation)
 Pandi (disambiguation)

References

Books

 

Social groups of Uttar Pradesh
Social groups of Uttarakhand
Garhwal division
Indian surnames
Nepali-language surnames
Khas surnames